Bamboo is a rural locality in the Shire of Douglas, Queensland, Australia. In the  Bamboo had a population of 129 people.

History
In the  Bamboo had a population of 129 people.

References 

Shire of Douglas
Localities in Queensland